The Connellan air disaster was a suicide attack at Alice Springs Airport, Northern Territory, Australia, on 5 January 1977.

The attack was carried out by a disgruntled former employee of Connellan Airways (also known as Connair), who flew a Beechcraft Baron into the Connair complex at the airport. The attack killed the pilot and four other people and injured four more, two of them seriously.

The disaster is one of only two aircraft suicide attacks in Australia's history, the other being in 1982 at Bankstown Airport.

Background
The perpetrator, Colin Richard Forman, was 23 years old at the time of the attack. Forman, born in the United Kingdom, had migrated by himself to Australia as a young adult. In 1974, he had attempted to forge an airline ticket to England. The forgery was detected and Forman had a conviction recorded against him.

In November 1975, Forman qualified as a commercial pilot; he started flying for Connair in January 1976. His conviction for forgery became known to his employers, and, after seven weeks with Connair, Forman was dismissed.  He found work as a pilot at Ord Air Charter in the northern Western Australian town of Wyndham, but was soon terminated there as well. Forman apparently believed that the proprietor of Connair, Roger Connellan, had informed Ord Air about Forman's conviction.

In late 1976, Forman was living in the Queensland city of Mount Isa, eking out a living flying occasional charter flights in a single-engine Cessna for freight and tourists, and becoming a member of the Mount Isa Aero Club. In about October 1976, he told a fellow member and local North West Star journalist, "If I don't get a job by Christmas then you will get to know, and through you most of the world will know". He attended the club's 1977 New Year's Eve party.

Attack
Early on the morning of 3 January 1977, Forman trashed his one-bedroom flat in Mount Isa in a fit of rage, piled up the remnants in a corner of his lounge room and created what was later described as an altar. On the top was a trophy for topping his course (Blue Flight) at the former Cessnock Nationwide Aviation Space Academy, and in front of the trophy was his pilot's log book, laid open.

On the date of Forman's sacking from Connair, an entry read: "Sentenced to death this date", and the final page of his log book contained the date, aircraft type, call sign, destination and "Suicide Mission". The final words were "THE END" on the left and right pages respectively.

On 5 January he stole a Beechcraft 58 Baron (Aircraft registration VH-ENA) from Wyndham Airport after discovering the larger aircraft he had wanted to use was being used by the Royal Flying Doctor Service that day. Alice Springs is four hours flying time from Wyndham in a Beechcraft Baron: Forman had planned to strike at 10 am during Connair's morning break, but he did not account for the one-and-a-half-hour time difference between Western Australia and the Northern Territory, and arrived at 11 am.

As he reached Alice Springs Airport, Forman broadcast a final message by radio: "It is better to die with honour than live without it – Echo – November – Alpha." Forman then set full power on both engines and aimed at the Connellan complex before plunging the aircraft into the centre of the building. Forman and three other people were killed on impact, including his former manager. A secretary was badly burned and died of her injuries in hospital five days later. Four other Connair employees were injured.

Aftermath 
During the investigation, letters addressed to the Department of Transport were found which explained Forman's motivations. In them he related his court appearance, described his seven weeks working at Connair as the happiest in his life, and his employment issues following dismissal. He also detailed his plan and his aim to "cause Connair the maximum amount of loss and hardship" and "to kill and maim as many employees of Connair Pty Ltd as possible". This latter comment was erroneously attributed to the final entry in his log book by some media outlets.

Connellan Airways was sold to East-West Airlines in 1980.

See also 
EgyptAir Flight 990
Silkair Flight 185
LAM Flight 470
Germanwings Flight 9525
2010 Austin suicide attack
Japan Airlines Flight 350
Royal Air Maroc Flight 630
2018 Horizon Air Q400 incident

References

1977 murders in Australia
Airliner accidents and incidents involving deliberate crashes
Alice Springs
Aviation accidents and incidents in 1977
Aviation accidents and incidents in the Northern Territory
Disasters in the Northern Territory
Mass murder in 1977
Murder–suicides in Australia
1970s in the Northern Territory
January 1977 events in Australia
January 1977 crimes
1977 disasters in Australia